Saint Mary's School is a private independent Episcopal college-preparatory, boarding and day school for girls in grades 9–12. Located in Raleigh, North Carolina, Saint Mary's School operates as an independent school with a historic association with the Episcopal Church including an Episcopal chapel, St. Mary's Chapel, on the school's grounds. The school formerly operated as Saint Mary's College and for many decades educated young women in grades 11–12 and their freshman and sophomore years in college. The school changed to a four year high school in 1998, at which point the name reverted to Saint Mary's School, the original name of the institution when it was founded in 1842.

School information 
The school has 40 faculty members, with 80% holding advanced degrees.  Enrollment for the 2019-2020 school year is 297 full-time students, representing 11 states and seven countries. The average class size is 13 students. Saint Mary's has a 8:1 student to faculty ratio. Additionally, 36 faculty and staff members reside on the campus.

Among the superlatives assigned to the school include the oldest continuously operated school in Raleigh, North Carolina, the third oldest girls' school in the state, and the fifth oldest girls' boarding/day school in the United States. Saint Mary's celebrated its 175th anniversary, May 12, 2017.

History 
Founded in 1842 by the Rev. Aldert Smedes, an Episcopal priest, Saint Mary's School has operated continuously on the same site ever since.

With the support of the Episcopal Diocese of North Carolina, Smedes founded Saint Mary's as a school for young ladies "designed to furnish a thorough and excellent education equal to the best that can be obtained in the city of New York, or in any Northern school." The school was founded on the site of the Episcopal School of North Carolina, a short-lived school for boys in the 1830s. Three of the present school buildings—East Rock, West Rock and Smedes Hall—formed the original campus. East Rock and West Rock, the first two buildings, were constructed with remnant stones from the construction of the North Carolina State Capitol.

During the Civil War, Saint Mary's became a safe haven for relatives of both Union and Confederate generals, including General Robert E. Lee's daughter, Mildred Childe Lee. Smedes kept the school operating throughout the war. In 1865, General William Tecumseh Sherman's Union troops camped in The Grove on front campus, and Sherman visited Smedes in the main building. From 1906-1908 President Woodrow Wilson's daughter Eleanor Wilson attended Saint Mary's.

In 1932, an alumna of the school, Margaret Mordecai Jones Cruikshank, was appointed as the seventh president of the school, making her the first woman president at Saint Mary's.

The school was racially integrated in the 1970s, when the first international students were admitted. The first African student graduated in the early 1970s, and the first African-American student graduated in 1981.

Today, Saint Mary's School is functions as an independent, Episcopal, college-preparatory, boarding and day school for girls in grades 9–12.

The historic core of the school's 23-acre campus is listed on the National Register of Historic Places and is a stop on the North Carolina Civil War Trails. The Saint Mary's Chapel, designed by Richard Upjohn, is a National Historic Site, and five of the school's 25 buildings are Raleigh Historic Properties.

Campus
Saint Mary's buildings date from the nineteenth and twentieth centuries and also include antebellum structures individually recognized as Local Historic Landmarks. Three buildings from the 1830s are visible from Hillsborough Street from behind a wooded glade of large oaks, hollies, and magnolias.
 
The school's oldest structures, East and West Rock, are matching buildings constructed with discarded stone from the building of the second North Carolina State Capitol in the 1830s. The brick Greek Revival building between them was erected soon after; it was remodeled in 1909 to include a Neoclassical Revival front portico and dormitory wings. This main building was named Smedes Hall for the school's founder, the Rev. Aldert Smedes.
 
Two buildings erected in the later nineteenth century are Gothic in style: the 1855 Richard Upjohn Gothic Chapel and the 1887 Gothic Revival arts building, a brick structure with pointed-arch windows.
 
The early twentieth century saw much construction; nearly all the permanent brick buildings, which were rendered in the Colonial Revival style, survive. Later construction continued to complement earlier buildings, and the view of the campus from Hillsborough Street remains notable for its historic integrity.

Saint Mary's School was listed on the National Register of Historic Places in 1978 as a national historic district. The district encompasses nine contributing buildings, including St. Mary's Chapel.  Currently, the campus is considered to be part of downtown Raleigh.

Athletics 
Saint Mary's School offers a full interscholastic athletic program consisting of 18 sports teams. Saint Mary's School competes as a member of the Triangle Independent Schools Athletic Conference (TISAC) and the North Carolina Independent Schools Athletic Association (NCISAA, 3A Classification). The following sports offered at Saint Mary's are:
 Soccer
 Cross Country
 Field Hockey
 Golf
 Tennis
 Volleyball
 Basketball
 Lacrosse
 Swimming
 Track and Field
 Softball

Notable people

Alumni 

 Madelon Battle Hancock (1881–1930), socialite and decorated volunteer nurse during World War I
 Sara Beaumont Cannon Kennedy (1859–1920), writer and newspaper editor
 Marie Watters Colton (1922–2018), first female Speaker Pro Tempore of the North Carolina House of Representatives
 Margaret Mordecai Jones Cruikshank (1878–1955), first female president of Saint Mary's School & Junior College
 Matilda Bradford Haughton Ehringhaus (1890–1980), First Lady of North Carolina
 Mary Dana Hinton, first African-American president of Hollins University
 Mary Hilliard Hinton (1869–1961), historian, painter, and anti-suffragist
 Laurel Holloman, actress and visual artist
 Betty Debnam Hunt, founder of The Mini Page
 Jeanne Jolly, singer and songwriter
 Sarah Graham Kenan (1876–1968), heiress and philanthropist
 Helen Whitaker Fowle Knight (1869–1948), First Lady of North Carolina and daughter of Governor Daniel Gould Fowle
 Mildred Childe Lee (1846–1905), society hostess and daughter of Confederate General Robert E. Lee
 Nell Battle Lewis (1893–1956), journalist, lawyer, and women's rights activist
 Eleanor Randolph Wilson McAdoo (1889–1967), author and daughter of U.S. President Woodrow Wilson
 Betty Ray McCain (born 1931), North Carolina Secretary of Culture and Chair of the North Carolina Democratic Party
 Emilie Watts McVea (1867–1928), academic administrator and president of Sweet Briar College
 Eliza Hall Nutt Parsley (1842–1920), founder and president of the NC Division of the United Daughters of the Confederacy
 Bevin Prince (b. 1982), actress
 Florence Wells Slater (1864–1941), entomologist and science teacher

Faculty 
 Margaret Mordecai Jones Cruikshank (1878–1955), first female president of Saint Mary's School & Junior College (also an alumna)
 Florence Wells Slater (1864–1941), science teacher (also an alumna)

See also
St. Mary's Chapel (Raleigh, North Carolina)
 List of Registered Historic Places in North Carolina

References

External links 
Saint Mary's School website
St. Mary's School Guidesheet, RHDC
 National Register Historic Districts in Raleigh, North Carolina, RHDC
 The Association of Boarding School profile

University and college buildings on the National Register of Historic Places in North Carolina
Educational institutions established in 1842
Girls boarding schools
Girls' schools in North Carolina
Private schools in Raleigh, North Carolina
Private high schools in North Carolina
Boarding schools in North Carolina
Episcopal schools in the United States
Defunct private universities and colleges in North Carolina
National Register of Historic Places in Raleigh, North Carolina
Historic districts on the National Register of Historic Places in North Carolina